Stratiotes is a genus of submerged aquatic plant commonly known as water soldiers, described as a genus by Linnaeus in 1753. Several specific names have been coined within the genus, but at present only one is recognized: Stratiotes aloides. native to Europe and NW Asia.

formerly included in genus
moved to other genera: Enhalus Hydrocleys Ottelia 
 Stratiotes acoroides  - Enhalus acoroides  
 Stratiotes alismoides - Ottelia alismoides  
 Stratiotes nymphoides - Hydrocleys nymphoides  
 Stratiotes quinquealatus - Ottelia alismoides

Description

The leaves are serrate and very brittle, breaking easily when handled. Reproduction is generally by offsets, which may number five or more per plant. In the UK, male plants have rarely if ever been recorded, although some hermaphrodite flowers have been recorded from more southerly locations. Sexual reproduction is not known to occur. A characteristic of the genus is the habit of the plants rising to the surface at flowering time.

Ecology

The plant appears to be associated with calcareous waters and there is a suggestion that changing levels of calcium carbonate on the leaves may explain the floating and submerging behaviour.

The rare dragonfly, the Norfolk hawker (Aeshna isosceles), relies on the presence of Stratiotes aloides as a food source for the smaller insects on which it feeds.
They are very winter hardy

Fossil record
Several  fossil seeds of †Stratiotes kaltennordheimensis have been extracted from borehole samples of the Middle Miocene fresh water deposits in Nowy Sacz Basin, West Carpathians, Poland.

Uses

Stratiotes aloides is commonly used in cool water ponds and aquariums in Europe.

References

External links
 Invading Species.com Partnership between the Ontario Ministry of Natural Resources and the Ontario Federation of Anglers and Hunters

Hydrocharitaceae
Hydrocharitaceae genera
Aquatic plants
Monotypic Alismatales genera
Dioecious plants